The Poisoners was the first Matt Helm novel of the 1970s. It was first published in 1971, as the thirteenth novel in the spy series by Donald Hamilton.

Plot summary
After a novice secret agent (Annette from The Menacers) is murdered—assassin Matt Helm (code name "Eric") is assigned to eliminate her killer, and find out why she was killed in the first place.

External links
Synopsis and summary

1971 American novels
Matt Helm novels